

References

 

Chemical data pages
Chemical data pages cleanup